Baladiyah al-Sulay, officially the Al-Sulay Sub-Municipality is a baladiyah and one of the 14 sub-municipalities of Riyadh, Saudi Arabia. It includes 13 neighborhoods and is responsible for their maintenance, development and planning.

Neighborhoods and districts 

 Al-Jazirah
 Al-Fayha
 Al-Sa'adah
 Khashm al-Aan
 Al-Sulay
 Al-Mishaal
 Al-Nur
 Al-Dafaa'
 Al-Iskan
 Al-Manakh
 Sinaiyah al-Jadidah
 Al-Birriyah

References 

Sulay